I Still Love You in the Same ol' Way is the 19th album by country singer Moe Bandy, released in 1982 on the Columbia label, although given as issued in 1983 on the UK album from which the following track listing was taken.

Track listing
"I Still Love You The Same Ol' Way" (V. Warner) - 2:51
"I Took The Princess Home With Me" (J. Dickens/D. Whitaker) - 3:06
"City Boy" (R. Roden/C. Blake/A. Pessis) - 2:17
"One Lonely Heart Leads To Another" (S. Collom) - 2:19
"Early Nancy" (D. Lee/M. Sameth) - 2:25
"I Lost Her To A Dallas Cowboy" (L. Green/J. Green) - 2:24
"What Chicago Took From Me" (J. Dickens/D. Whitaker) - 2:43
"Leave The Honky Tonks Alone" (S. Milete/R. Wade) - 2:37
"Drivin' My Love Back To You" (J. Dickens/D. Whitaker) - 2:21
"Monday Night Cheatin'" (J. M. Roberson/A. R. Fleetwood) - 2:21

Musicians
Piano - David Briggs
Fiddle - Johnny Gimble, Buddy Spicher
Lead guitar - Gregg Galbraith
Rhythm guitar - Leo Jackson, Ray Edenton
Drums - Larrie Londin, Jerry Kroon
Bass - Henry Strzelecki
Steel guitar - Weldon Myrick, Hal Rugg
Harmonica - Terry McMillan

Backing
The Jordanaires with Laverna Moore

Production
Sound engineers - Ron Reynolds, Billy Sherrill
Photography - Alan Messer

References

1983 albums
Moe Bandy albums
Columbia Records albums
Albums produced by Ray Baker (music producer)